Anthalia is a genus of hybotid dance flies in the family Hybotidae. There are about 15 described species in Anthalia.

Species
These 15 species belong to the genus Anthalia:

A. beatricella Chandler, 1992 c g
A. brevicornis (Strobl, 1899) i c g b
A. bulbosa (Melander, 1902) i c g
A. femorata Melander, 1927 i c g
A. flava Coquillett, 1903 i c g
A. gilvihirta (Coquillett, 1903) i c g
A. inornata Melander, 1927 i c g
A. interrupta Melander, 1927  i c g
A. lacteipennis Melander, 1927 i c g
A. mandalota Melander, 1927 i c g
A. petiolata Melander, 1927 c g
A. schoenherri Zetterstedt, 1838 i c g
A. scutellaris Melander, 1927 i c g
A. sinensis Saigusa & Yang, 2003 c g
A. stigmalis Coquillett, 1903 i c g

Data sources: i = ITIS, c = Catalogue of Life, g = GBIF, b = Bugguide.net

References

Hybotidae
Articles created by Qbugbot
Empidoidea genera